Nonpareil(s) from the French meaning 'without equal', it may also refer to:

 Nonpareil, Guyana, a village in Guyana
 Nonpareil, Nebraska, a community in the United States
 Nonpareil, Oregon, a former community in the United States
 Nonpareils, a confectionery of small sweet spheres used to decorate cakes, sweets, and pastries
 Jack "Nonpareil" Dempsey (1862–1895), Irish boxer
 HMS Nonpareil, several ships
 Nonpareil, a rag composed by Scott Joplin published in 1907
 Nonpareil, an Al Cohn jazz recording from 1981
 Nonpareil, a variety of almond
 Nonpareil, a caper (caper bud) of a smaller size
 Nonpareil (apple), an apple cultivar
 nonpareil (typography), the type size between minion and agate
 Painted bunting, a type of bird also known as nonpareil
 The Nonpareil Club, a fictional club mentioned in The Hound of the Baskervilles
 The Daily Nonpareil, a newspaper in Iowa, United States

Small particles:
 Sprinkles, a slightly different decorative candy

See also 
 Sans Pareil (disambiguation)